The Interior Division is an administrative division of the state of Sabah, Malaysia. It occupies the southwest portion of Sabah, bordered by the neighbouring state of Sarawak on its west. With an area of 18,298 square kilometres, it covers 24.9% of Sabah's territory and is home to approximately 14.7% of Sabah's total population. The largest town in the Interior Division is Keningau. Other main towns in this division include Beaufort, Kuala Penyu, Sipitang, Tambunan and Tenom.

The coastal parts of the Division are settled mainly by Bisaya, Bruneian Malays and Kedayan, whereas the inland areas to the east of the Crocker Range are mostly settled by various subgroups of the Kadazan-Dusun people. The town of Tambunan is considered to be a major centre of Kadazan culture, while Tenom is the largest town in the heartland of the Murut people. The Long Pasia and Long Mio are the gateway to the Lun Bawang/ Lun Dayeh tribes in Sipitang. In addition, there are large numbers of Chinese people in most of the towns, particularly Beaufort, Keningau and Tenom. The majority of the Division's ethnic Chinese residents are of the Hakka subgroup.

Districts 
Interior Division is subdivided into the following administrative districts:
 Beaufort District (1,735 km2) (Beaufort Town)
 Keningau District (3,533 km2) (Keningau Town)
 Kuala Penyu District (453 km2) (Kuala Penyu Town)
 Membakut District (Membakut Town)
 Nabawan District (6,089 km2) (Nabawan Town)
 Sipitang District (2,732 km2) (Sipitang Town)
 Tambunan District (1,347 km2) (Tambunan Town)
 Tenom District (2,409 km2) (Tenom Town)

Member of Parliament (Dewan Rakyat)

History 
The present divisions of Sabah is largely inherited from the division of the North Borneo Chartered Company. Following the acquisition of North Borneo under the royal charter issued in 1881, the administrative division introduced by Baron von Overbeck was continued by the establishment of two residences comprising West Coast Residency and East Coast Residency. Seat of the two residents was in Sandakan, where the governor was based. Each resident, in turn, was divided into several provinces managed by a district officer.

As North Borneo progresses, the number of residencies has increased to five including: Tawau Residency (also known as East Coast Residency), Sandakan Residency, West Coast Residency, Kudat Residency, and Interior Residency; the provinces were initially named after the members of the board: Alcock, Cunlife, Dewhurst, Keppel, Dent, Martin, Elphinstone, Myburgh and Mayne. The senior residents occupied Sandakan and the West Coast, while the other three resident with the second class residencies occupied Interior, East Coast and Kudat. The residents of Sandakan and West Coast were members of the Legislative Council, the Legislative Assembly of the company.

The division into residencies was maintained when North Borneo became a Crown Colony after World War II. On 16 September 1963, with the formation of Malaysia, North Borneo which subsequently became the state of Sabah took over the administrative structure through the Ordinance on Administrative Units. At the same time, the Yang di-Pertua Negeri, the head of state of Sabah, was authorised by proclamation to divide the state into divisions and districts. The abolition of the residency term was in favour of the division term that took place in 1976.

Today, the division has only formal significance and no longer constitutes its own administrative level. The resident's post was also abolished, as Sabah's municipal administration is in the hands of the district officers.

See also 
 Divisions of Malaysia

Notes

Literature

References

Further reading 
 State of Sabah: Administrative Divisions Ordinance – Sabah Cap. 167  (PDF) of 1 November 1954; last amended on 16 September 1963, as amended in August 2010; Accessed on 3 November 2017